Madinat al-Awda is a Palestinian village in the Gaza Governorate located in the northwestern suburbs of Gaza City along the Mediterranean coast and between al-Shati Camp and al-Atatra. Its population in the 1997 Palestinian Central Bureau of Statistics (PCBS) census was 420, rising to 590 in 2006. It is administered by a local development committee under the Palestinian National Authority.

References

Villages in the Gaza Strip